This is the electoral history for Gavin Newsom, who has served on the San Francisco Board of Supervisors and as Mayor of San Francisco and Lieutenant Governor of California. He is the current governor of California.

Electoral history

San Francisco Board of Supervisors

Mayor of San Francisco

Lieutenant Governor of California

Governor of California

References

Gavin Newsom
Newsom, Gavin